The Mansion at Fort Chiswell, also known as the McGavock Mansion and Fort Chiswell Mansion, is a historic home located at Fort Chiswell near Max Meadows, Wythe County, Virginia. It was constructed in 1839–1840, by Stephen and Joseph Cloyd McGavock, and is a two-story, Greek Revival style brick dwelling.  The front facade features two-story diastyle portico composed of two provincial Greek Doric order columns supporting a pediment.  It has a steep gable ends with slightly projecting end chimneys and one-story Italianate bracketed porches.  It has a two-story rear ell with a frame gallery and an attached a one-story brick kitchen. It is a private residence, available for tours and events.

It was listed on the National Register of Historic Places in 1972.

References

Houses on the National Register of Historic Places in Virginia
Houses completed in 1840
Greek Revival houses in Virginia
Italianate architecture in Virginia
Houses in Wythe County, Virginia
National Register of Historic Places in Wythe County, Virginia
Tourist attractions in Wythe County, Virginia
McGavock family residences